Hiroden Streetcar route 8 is a streetcar route operated by the Hiroshima Electric Railway. It runs between Yokogawa Station and Eba Station.

Overview

Lines
Hiroden Streetcar route 8 runs on the Hiroden Yokogawa Line, Hiroden Main Line, and the Hiroden Eba Line.

Stations

References

8